Cape Betbeder is a cape which marks the southwest end of Andersson Island, lying in Antarctic Sound off the northeast tip of Antarctic Peninsula. Charted by the Swedish Antarctic Expedition on the Antarctic, 1901–04, under Otto Nordenskjöld, and named by him for R. Admiral Onofre Betbeder, Argentine Minister of Marine, upon whose orders the Argentine ship Uruguay was dispatched to rescue Nordenskjold's expedition.

Headlands of the Joinville Island group